Guthega Power Station is located in the Snowy Mountains region of New South Wales, Australia. The power station's purpose is for the generation of electricity. It is the first to be completed and smallest of the initial seven hydroelectric power stations that comprise the Snowy Mountains Scheme, a vast hydroelectricity and irrigation complex constructed in south-east Australia between 1949 and 1974 and now run by Snowy Hydro.

This station is connected to the National Electricity Market via the TransGrid 330/132KV Substation at the TransGrid 330KV Murray Switching Station, 1.56 kilometres (1.71 mi) South East of Khancoban.

Location and features
It is a conventional hydroelectric power station, situated above ground. The waters held in the reservoir behind Guthega dam pass through a concrete lined tunnel, a surge tank and firstly one, then two steel penstocks to the power station to generate electricity.

Approximately  of concrete was used in its construction which commenced in November 1951 and was completed in April 1955.

The power station has two Francis turbines each driving an English Electric generator. The power station includes foundations for a third unit but this was never installed as there was insufficient water to make it worthwhile.

The Guthega Power Station is the highest power station in Australia.

See also 
 Guthega, New South Wales
 Snowy Mountains Scheme
 Snowy Hydro Limited

References

Energy infrastructure completed in 1955
Snowy Mountains Scheme
1955 establishments in Australia